Guillaucourt is a former railway station located in the commune of Guillaucourt in the Somme department, France. The station was served by TER Picardie trains from Amiens to Saint-Quentin.

See also
List of SNCF stations in Hauts-de-France

References

Defunct railway stations in Somme (department)